This article is a non-comprehensive list of universities in China, which is defined as the People's Republic of China (PRC) in mainland China, as well as the Hong Kong and Macau SARs.

By September 2021, there were 3,012 colleges and universities, with over 40 million students enrolled in mainland China, and 156 colleges in the ROC free area. More than 40 million Chinese students graduated from university from 2016 to 2020. Corresponding with the merging of many public universities, has been the rapid expansion of the private sector in mainland China since 1990s. Although private university enrollments are not clear, one report listed that in 2006 private universities accounted for approximately 6%, or about 1.3 million, of the 20 million students enrolled in formal higher education in China. The quality of universities and higher education in China is internationally recognized as China has established educational cooperation and exchanges with 188 countries and regions and 46 major international organizations, and signed agreements with 54 countries such as the US, British, Australia and Germany on mutual recognition of higher education qualifications and academic degrees.

China has the world's second-highest number of top universities (the highest in Asia & Oceania region). In 2017, China had the highest number of scientific publications. As of 2022, China had the largest number of universities (247) including in the CWTS Leiden Ranking edition. More than 2,500 universities in China are included in the Webometrics Ranking of World Universities. Regardless of a variety of rankings about universities in China, the Ministry of Education of China does not advocate or recognize any ranking conducted by a third party.

In 2015, a tertiary education development initiative (Double First Class University Plan) designed by the People's Republic of China government was launched, which aims to comprehensively develop elite Chinese universities into world first class institutions by improving their faculty departments to world-class level by the end of 2050. The full list of the sponsored universities was published in September 2017, which includes 140 Double First Class Universities.

In February 2022, with the approval of the State Council of China, the list of "Double First-Class Universities" was updated and announced. According to the Phase 2 List of the Double First-Class University Plan, 147 universities were included in the plan after seven universities were added to the list in February 2022, representing the top 5% of the total 3,012 universities and colleges in China.

Municipalities

Provinces

Autonomous regions

Special administrative regions 
Hong Kong
Macau

Leading and time-honored universities in China
Peking University is the second modern national university established in China, after Peiyang University. It was founded as Imperial University of Peking in 1898 in Beijing as a replacement of the ancient Guozijian, the national central institute of learning in China's traditional educational system in the past thousands of years. Three years earlier, Sheng Xuanhuai submitted a memorial to Guangxu Emperor to request for approval to set up a modern higher education institution in Tianjin. After approval on 2 October 1895, Peiyang Western Study School was founded by him and American educator Charles Daniel Tenney and later developed to Peiyang University. In 1896, Sheng Xuanhuai delivered his new memorials to Guangxu Emperor to make a suggestion that two official modern higher education institutions should be established in Beijing/Tangshan and Shanghai. In the same year, he founded Nanyang Public School in Shanghai by an imperial edict issued by Guangxu Emperor. The institution initially included an elementary school, secondary school, college, and a normal school. Later the institution changed its name to Jiao Tong University (also known as Chiao Tung University). In the 1930s, the university often referred itself as "MIT in the East" due to its reputation of nurturing top engineers and scientists. In the 1950s, part of this university was moved to Xi'an, Shaanxi, and was established as Xi'an Jiaotong University; the part of the university remaining in Shanghai was renamed Shanghai Jiao Tong University. These two universities have developed independently since then, along with the original Beijing Jiaotong University.

Meanwhile, Wuhan University also claimed that its predecessor Ziqiang Institute was the first modern higher education institution in China. On 29 November 1893, Zhang Zhidong submitted his memorial to Guangxu Emperor to request for approval to set up an institution designed for training students specializing in foreign languages, mathematics, science, and business. After Ziqiang was founded in Wuchang, not only courses in foreign languages was taught, courses in science (chemical and mining courses starting from 1896) and business (business course starting from the very beginning) were also developed at the school. Later, although the school officially changed its name to Foreign Languages Institute in 1902, the school still offered courses in science and business. In China, there had been some earlier schools specializing in foreign languages learning, such as Schools of Combined Learning in Beijing (founded in 1862), in Shanghai (founded in 1863), and in Guangzhou, founded in 1864, but few provided courses in other fields, which hardly qualified as modern education institutions. Some argued that Wuhan University can only trace its history back to 1913 when the National Wuchang Higher Normal College was established, but Wuhan University officially recognized its establishment as in 1893, relying on the abundance of historical documentation and the experts' endorsement. 

Tianjin University (1895) celebrated its 100th anniversary in 1995, which would predate the establishment of Peking University. Jiao Tong University (in all Beijing Jiaotong University, Southwest Jiaotong University in Chengdu, Shanghai Jiao Tong University  and Xi'an Jiaotong University) followed in 1996. As of 2022, other national key universities as a part of former Project 985, such as Sichuan University (1896), Zhejiang University (1897), Peking University (1898), Shandong University (1901), Beijing Normal University (1902), Nanjing University (1902), Southeast University (1902), Hunan University (1903), Fudan University (1905), China Agricultural University (1905), Tongji University (1907), Lanzhou University (1909), Tsinghua University (1911), Nankai University (1919), Harbin Institute of Technology (1920), and Xiamen University (1921) also recently celebrated their hundredth anniversaries, one after another. 

Other notable and public universities also celebrated their 100 anniversaries, including Hebei Medical University (1894), Xi'an University of Architecture and Technology (1895), Xinxiang Medical University (1896), Huazhong Agricultural University (1898), Wuhan University of Technology (1898), Wuhan University of Science and Technology (1898), Soochow University (1900), Guizhou University (1902), Jiangnan University (1902), Nanjing Agricultural University (1902), Nanjing Normal University (1902), Northwest University (China) (1902), Shanxi University (1902), Nanjing Forestry University (1902), Taiyuan University of Technology (1902), Central China Normal University (1903), Hebei University of Technology (1903),Jinan University (1906), University of Shanghai for Science and Technology (1906), Sichuan Agricultural University (1906), Southwest University (1906), Dalian Maritime University (1909), Shanghai Maritime University (1909), South China Agricultural University (1909), China University of Mining and Technology (1909), Shanghai Ocean University (1912), Henan University (1912), Hohai University (1915), Peking Union Medical College (1917), Shanghai University of Finance and Economics (1917), Central Academy of Fine Arts (1918),  Shanghai University (1922), and Yunnan University (1922).

After the Chinese Civil War, parts of some famous universities of mainland China were transferred to the island of Taiwan: notably the National Central University and National Tsing Hua University. As a result, some universities on both sides of the Taiwan Strait share the same names. In the ROC-controlled Fujian, only one university, National Quemoy University was founded in 1997.

Remark:

Universities in People's Republic of China

Double First Class University Plan 
In October 2015, the State Council of the People's Republic of China published the 'Overall Plan for Promoting the Construction of World First Class Universities and First Class Disciplines' (Overall Plan for Double First Class University Plan), aiming to comprehensively develop elite Chinese universities into world-class institutions through building and strengthening their disciplines and faculties, and eventually developing the universities included in this plan into 'world-first-class' universities by 2050. The Double First Class University Plan makes new arrangements for the development of higher education in China, and represents a whole new way of ranking universities in China, replacing previous projects such as 'Project 211', 'Project 985' or 'Project Characteristic Key Disciplines'.

In September 2017, the full list of the Double First Class University Plan universities and disciplines was published by the Ministry of Education of China, the Ministry of Finance of China and the National Development and Reform Commission of China. 140 elite Chinese universities are included in the Double First Class University Plan. In February 2022, with the approval of the State Council of China, the updated list of "Double First Class Universities" was released by the Ministry of Education, the Ministry of Finance, and the National Development and Reform Commission. Apart from the 140 remained universities, 7 universities have been newly added into the Double First Class University Plan, and the previous university classifications within the plan have been abolished. 

The 147 Double First Class universities account for roughly 4.88% of the total 3,012 universities and colleges in China, representing the most elite part of Chinese higher education institutions. 

* represent the newly added universities in the Phase 2 list of Double First Class University Plan.

Sino-foreign cooperative universities
China has a number of Sino-foreign cooperative universities, which are legally independent entities formed as joint ventures between Chinese universities and international partners. It includes:
 Tsinghua-Berkeley Shenzhen Institute (TBSI), Shenzhen
University of Michigan–Shanghai Jiao Tong University Joint Institute (UM-SJTU JI)
Duke Kunshan University
New York University Shanghai (NYU Shanghai)
Shenzhen MSU-BIT University
Xi'an Jiaotong-Liverpool University (XJTLU)
The University of Nottingham Ningbo China
Chinese University of Hong Kong, Shenzhen (CUHK-Shenzhen)
Guangdong Technion-Israel Institute of Technology (GTIIT)
Wenzhou-Kean University
Beijing Normal University-Hong Kong Baptist University United International College

Leading universities in Hong Kong and Macau

Rankings
Regardless of a variety of rankings about universities in China, the Ministry of Education of China does not advocate or recognize any ranking conducted by any third party.

Other international rankings:
Academic Ranking of World Universities by Shanghai Jiaotong University
U.S. News & World Report Best Global University Ranking by U.S. News & World Report
Times Higher Education World University Rankings by Times Higher Education
QS World University Rankings by QS World University Rankings
CWTS Leiden Ranking by CWTS Leiden Ranking
University Ranking by Academic Performance by the University Ranking by Academic Performance.
Nature Index Institution Outputs Ranking  by Nature Research
UTN Rankings by Performance Ranking of Scientific Papers for World Universities
SCImago Institutions Rankings by SCImago Institutions Rankings
The Center for World University Rankings  by the Center for World University Rankings (CWUR)
Webometrics Ranking of World Universities ranks more than 2,500 universities in China

See also

Double First Class University Plan
C9 League
Project 985
Project 211
Plan 111
State Key Laboratories
Law schools in China
Education in the People's Republic of China
Higher Education in China
National Higher Education Entrance Examination
OpenCourseWare in China
China Open Resources for Education
Association of East Asian Research Universities
Association of Pacific Rim Universities
BESETOHA
Global U8 Consortium
International Alliance of Research Universities
Universitas 21
Worldwide Universities Network

Related lists

List of universities in Hong Kong
List of universities in Macau
List of universities in Taiwan
List of Christian Colleges in China
List of colleges and universities by country
List of colleges and universities
List of schools of Journalism and Communication in China

References

Further reading 
  National Colleges and Universities List (1909 institutions in total as of 18-May-2007, Location, authority and level are also given)
  List of Chinese Higher Education Institutions — Ministry of Education

Universities
China
China
Educational organizations based in China